Karlee Burgess (born September 14, 1998) is a Canadian curler from Winnipeg, Manitoba. She currently plays third on Team Jennifer Jones.

Career
At just 15 years old, Burgess played second for the Mary Fay rink along with, Jenn Smith and Janique LeBlanc and won the 2014 Nova Scotia Junior women's championship. They were the youngest team to win in 20 years., sending the four-some to the 2014 Canadian Junior Curling Championships to represent Nova Scotia.  Despite their youth, the team finished with an 8–2 record, making the playoffs. The team would go on to lose to British Columbia, skipped by Kalia Van Osch in the semi-final, winning a bronze medal. The next year, the Fay rink won their second U21 Nova Scotia Provincials, earning the right to represent Nova Scotia at their second back-to-back Canadian Junior Curling Championship. The rink fell one step shorter than their previous year, finishing in a tie for fourth place with a 6–4 record. The Fay rink then qualified for the 2016 Canadian Juniors with their third provincial title. The rink finished in first place after the round robin with a 9–1 record, earning the rink a direct bye to the finals. In the finals, she played the British Columbia rink, this time skipped by Sarah Daniels, and won her first Canadian Junior title by defeating the British Columbia rink 9–5, and therefore representing Canada at the 2016 World Juniors in Copenhagen, Denmark.

Team Fay has also won three Under-15 provincial championships and won the 2013 Under-18 provincial championships, as well as the 2013 U-18 Atlantics. They represented Nova Scotia at the 2015 Canada Winter Games after beating club mate Cassie Cocks 7–3 in the provincial final. While at the games Burgess and her Nova Scotian team went undefeated through the Round Robin, finishing with a perfect 5–0 record. According to the announcers when their game against Manitoba was televised on TSN, the Fay rink had the highest player percentages at every position and the highest team percentage after the first two draws. Their perfect record in the Round Robin earned them a bye to the Semi Finals. They once again played New Brunswick's Justine Comeau, after defeating her 7–5 in the Round Robin, and won on the last rock in the last end in a 7-6 decision. They went on to play Ontario in the Gold Medal Game, in which they lost 6–5 in an extra end. Jenn Smith and the Fay rink then parted ways after the completion of the 2014–15 season.

Burgess and skip, Mary Fay along with B.C. curlers Tyler Tardi and Sterling Middleton would later be selected from curlers who competed in the Canada Winter Games to represent Canada in the 2016 Youth Olympics in Lillehammer, Norway. The rink, skipped by Mary Fay went undefeated in the tournament, winning the gold medal after a resounding 10–4 win against the United States of America in the final.

The Fay rink would play in their first World Curling Tour event at the 2014 Gibson's Cashspiel, where they lost in the final to Mary-Anne Arsenault.

For the 2019–20 season, she and teammate Lauren Lenentine moved to Manitoba to join the Zacharias siblings Mackenzie and Emily to try to return to the World Juniors. The team won the Manitoba Junior Provincials, qualifying for the national championship. The team went on to win the 2020 Canadian Junior Curling Championships and later the 2020 World Junior Curling Championships.

Due to the COVID-19 pandemic in Canada, many provinces had to cancel their provincial championships, with member associations selecting their representatives for the 2021 Scotties Tournament of Hearts. Due to this situation, Curling Canada added three Wild Card teams to the national championship, which were based on the CTRS standings from the 2019–20 season. Because Team Zacharias ranked 11th on the CTRS and kept at least three of their four players together for the 2020–21 season, they got the second Wild Card spot at the 2021 Scotties in Calgary, Alberta. At the Hearts, they finished with a 3–5 round robin record, failing to qualify for the championship round.

Team Zacharias won their second event of the 2021–22 season, going undefeated to capture the Mother Club Fall Curling Classic. They later had a semifinal finish at the Stu Sells Toronto Tankard after losing to eventual winners Team Hollie Duncan. Because of their successes on tour, Team Zacharias had enough points to qualify for the 2021 Canadian Olympic Curling Pre-Trials. At the Pre-Trials, the team finished the round robin with a 4–2 record. This qualified them for the double knockout round, where they lost both of their games and were eliminated. Elsewhere on tour, the team reached the quarterfinals of the Red Deer Curling Classic and won the MCT Championships in November 2021. At the 2022 Manitoba Scotties Tournament of Hearts in December 2021, Team Zacharias finished with a 3–2 record in their pool, enough to advance to the championship pool. They then won three straight games to finish first overall and earn a bye to the provincial final. In the final, they faced the Kristy Watling rink which they defeated 7–5, earning the right to represent Manitoba at the 2022 Scotties Tournament of Hearts. At the Hearts, the team finished the round robin with a 5–3 record. This qualified them for a tiebreaker against the Northwest Territories' Kerry Galusha, which they lost 8–6 and were eliminated. Team Zacharias played in their first Grand Slam event at the 2022 Players' Championship. There, they posted a 2–3 record, missing the playoffs. They wrapped up their season at the 2022 Best of the West event where they lost in the semifinals to Corryn Brown.

On March 17, 2022, Team Zacharias announced that they would be joining forces with Jennifer Jones for the 2022–23 season. Jones would take over the team as skip, with the four Zacharias members each moving down one position in the lineup.

Personal life
Burgess was a kinesiology student at Dalhousie University, and attended the University of Manitoba. She currently works as a conductive education assistant at Movement Centre of Manitoba. She is currently in a relationship with fellow curler Jacques Gauthier.

Teams

References

External links

Living people
1998 births
Canadian women curlers
Curlers from Nova Scotia
Curlers from Winnipeg
People from Truro, Nova Scotia
Curlers at the 2016 Winter Youth Olympics
Dalhousie University alumni
University of Manitoba alumni
Youth Olympic gold medalists for Canada